Al Humaid City is a residential and commercial development being created in Ajman Emirate in the United Arab Emirates. This development is situated along the Emirates Road and across from Emirates City.  There are 69 residential towers in this development; these towers range from 25 to 35 stories.

See also 
 Emirates City
 Marmooka City
 Mermaid City

References 
Al Humaid City website

Populated places in the Emirate of Ajman
Buildings and structures under construction in the United Arab Emirates